Delhi Metropolitan Council election, 1977 was held in Indian National Capital Territory of Delhi to elect 56 councillors to the Delhi Metropolitan Council. This Council had no legislative powers, but only an advisory role in administration of the territory.

Results

!colspan=10|
|-
!colspan=2|Party
!Candidates
!Seats won
!Votes
!Vote %
|-
| 
|align="left"|Janata Party||56||46||783,873||52.88%
|-
| 
|align="left"|Indian National Congress||52||10||538,974||36.15%
|-
!colspan=2| Total !! 249 !! 56 !! 1,490,959 !!
|-
|}
The election elected Third Delhi Metropolitan Council. Kalka Dass was Chairman of the Council, Begum Khursheed Kidwai being Deputy Chairman.

Elected members

References

1977 elections in India
Elections in Delhi
Local elections in Delhi
1970s in Delhi
Autonomous district council elections in India